U.S. Figure Skating is the national governing body for the sport of figure skating in the United States. It is recognized as such by the United States Olympic & Paralympic Committee "USOPC" under the Ted Stevens Olympic and Amateur Sports Act and is the United States member of the International Skating Union ("ISU"). Although the name of the organization is “the United States Figure Skating Association” it is now known as and conducts business under the name “U.S. Figure Skating.” Founded in 1921, U.S. Figure Skating regulates and governs the sport and defines and maintains the standard of skating proficiency. It specifies the rules for testing, competitions, and all other figure skating related activities. U.S. Figure Skating promotes interest and participation in the sport by assisting member clubs, skaters, and athletes, appointing officials, organizing competitions, exhibitions, and other figure skating pursuits, and offering a wide variety of programs.

Athletes and officials who represent the United States at international figure skating competitions are selected by U.S. Figure Skating.

The Association is a non-profit organization.

History

In 1921 the United States Figure Skating Association was formed and became a member of the International Skating Union. At the time of its formation, the Association was composed of seven (7) charter member clubs including: Beaver Dam Winter Sports Club, The Skating Club of Boston, Chicago Figure Skating Club The Skating Club of New York, Philadelphia Skating Club and Humane Society, Sno Birds of Lake Placid, and Twin City Figure Skating Club (which became the Figure Skating Club of Minneapolis in 1929).

Since its inception through 1947, the governance activities of the Association were centered in New York City. The annual Governing Council meetings, as well as the annual Executive Committee meetings, were all held in New York City. In 1949 the Association transferred its offices to Chicago, Illinois. The offices were again moved, this time to Boston, in 1950. In 1979, the Association moved into its current headquarters in Colorado Springs, Colorado. This followed the USOC's move to Colorado Springs a year earlier in July 1978.

In the 1930s, the Association made an effort to increase the number of competitive events by creating the three sectional championships, Eastern (1938), Midwestern (1933), and Pacific Coast (1936).

In 1959, the Eastern and Pacific Coast Sections expanded their qualifying competitions by adding three Sub-Sectionals Championships each. The Eastern Section created the New England, North Atlantic, and South Atlantic Regions, while the Pacific Coast Section established the Central Pacific, Northwest, and Southwest Pacific Regions. It wasn't until 1962 that the Midwestern Sectional finally added their regional championships to the qualifying competition cycle.

The abbreviated name, "USFSA" was first used in April 1921 and trademarked in 1972. The distinctive shield logo was adopted in 1964 and used until 2003 when U.S. Figure Skating instituted its current logo.

In 2006, the Executive Committee was eliminated. At the same time the Board of Directors was reduced to sixteen members from its previous 29 members.

As of May 5, 2007, the Association officially adopted the name "U.S. Figure Skating" and dropped the abbreviated name of "USFSA".

Governance
U.S. Figure Skating is an association of clubs, governed by its members and its elected officers at national, regional and club levels. As of June 2011, U.S. Figure Skating had 688 member, collegiate, and school-affiliated clubs and a membership of 180,452. Each member club may send delegates to the annual Governing Council meeting.

Governing Council
U.S. Figure Skating has a representational government. Clubs and individual members appoint delegates. The number of delegates representing a club and the individual members depends on the prior year's paid registered member. Athlete delegate representation is required to be 20 percent of the prior year's registered delegate and proxy votes. Collectively these delegates meet annually (typically early May) to review, amend and ratify the actions taken by the Board since the prior year's Governing Council. This annual meeting of the appointed delegates is called the Governing Council.

Board of Directors
The Board of Directors is charged with the management of the business and affairs of U.S. Figure Skating. It is currently composed of sixteen (16) members including: the president, three (3) vice presidents (one from each section), the secretary, the treasurer, four (4) group coordinators, two (2) coaches, and four (4) athletes.

Presidents
Samuel Auxier is the current president of U.S. Figure Skating. He began his term in 2022. The prior presidents are listed below.

Past presidents

Committees
Committees, in particular the Permanent Committees, are responsible for proposing and enforcing the rules of the U.S. Figure Skating. Other special committees may undertake other projects, such as nominations and other ad hoc matters.

Permanent committees
The following table shows the Association's permanent committees:

Mission statement
“As the national governing body, the mission of the United States Figure Skating Association is to provide programs to encourage participation and achievement in the sport of figure skating on ice.”

Operations

Executive Director
The Executive Director is responsible for the day-to-day operations of U.S. Figure Skating. Mr. David Raith is currently serving in that capacity and has done so since 2005. He is charged with carrying out the policies, programs, and goals of the association as approved by the Board of Directors.

Departments
The departments that support U.S. Figure Skating's operations reside at its headquarters in Colorado Springs, CO. These departments are staffed by full-time employees. They administer and manage the association's day-to-day affairs.

Finance
The Association is a non-profit organization. As of June 30, 2011, U.S. Figure Skating had revenue, support, and gains of approximately $24.9 million derived primarily from dues, admissions and activity fees, skating events, sponsorships, broadcast and licensing, publications, grants, and other sources.  The association expended approximately $12.9 million on its various programs and services plus an additional $2.4 million on management and general administrative expenses, under which the departments listed under the “Operations – Departments” are included.

Officials
Member clubs arrange to hold test sessions and competitions. The competitions are conducted under the supervision and authority of U.S. Figure Skating appointed officials. The member club (for competitions, the club is sometimes called the local organizing committee or “LOC”) is responsible for many of the ancillary functions of the test session or competition (registration, transportation, event monitoring, hospitality, messengers, copying, etc.). For national and international events, U.S. Figure Skating headquarters staff also provides logistics and event support. The officials are responsible for actually running the test sessions, competitions, and associated individual events. All the officials at test sessions and competitions are unpaid volunteers.

Officials receive their appointments from U.S. Figure Skating after demonstrating a certain level of proficiency, and in some cases, after trialing or taking written examinations. In most cases, officials are appointed at three (3) levels; regional, sectional, and national.

Below is a list of officials at a typical large competition. For the 2012 U.S. Figure Skating Championships, 70 officials were assigned along with over 50 alternate officials. The parenthetical number is how many people were assigned to the respective positions. If there is no number, only one person was assigned.

Organization
U.S. Figure Skating's members, clubs, and qualifying competitions are divided into three (3) geographical sections, that are further divided into nine (9) regions.

Eastern Section

1Erie, PA
2excluding Erie, PA

Midwestern Section

1excluded for Synchronized only
2Upper Peninsula
3Lower Peninsula
4excluding Kansas City and St. Joseph's
5excluding Chattanooga
6Kansas City and St. Joseph's

Pacific Coast Section

1all cities north of and including Visalia
2for Synchronized only
3all cities south of Visalia
4Las Vegas
5excluding Las Vegas

Types of membership
U.S. Figure Skating has nine (9) types of membership:

U.S. Figure Skating programs
U.S. Figure Skating offers many programs to accommodate a wide range of skill and interest levels.

Testing
Testing allows figure skaters to demonstrate that they have achieved a certain level of skating proficiency. Tests progress in increasing difficulty and focus on power, strength, speed, quickness, flow, extension, and edge quality and control. Tests are conducted under the auspices of member clubs and administered during test sessions. Usually, three (3) test judges (the judge panel), of appropriate level, determine the outcome of the tests on a pass / retry basis. Tests up to a certain level may be judged by a single, sufficiently qualified, judge. Some higher-level dance tests require judges certified in dance judging to attend. The member club is responsible for reporting the results to U.S. Figure Skating. U.S. Figure appoints test judges at various levels (bronze, silver, and gold) based on trial judging and their judging experience. According to their level, test judges are qualified to determine the outcome of increasingly difficult tests. Test judges are invited by the member club to participate in a given test session. Skaters’ testing levels passed determines at what level they may compete. For qualifying competitions, skaters must pass the free skate test at the level for which they intend to compete. U.S. Figure Skating still offers tests in compulsory figures, however, this discipline was last competed at a national championship competition in 1999.

Singles and adult skaters must show they are proficient at a given level by passing two (2) tests at each level, moves in the field ("MIF") and free skate ("FS"). Additional test are conducted in the pairs skating, free dance and pattern dance discipline. Each member of a synchronized skating team must pass the appropriate test of single's competitor.

Tests must be completed in the order of increasing difficulty. They may not be taken out of turn. However, a singles skater may take as many moves-in-the-field tests before taking any free skate tests. Once a free skate test is passed, a competitor may only compete at that level at qualifying competitions. There are four (4) test levels specific to adult figure skating. Adult skater must be twenty-one (21) years of age or older.

Standard track levels

1The test panel consists of three test judges of these levels or higher, appointed in single/pairs or dance for MIF or in single/pairs for FS.
2The test panel consists of three dance test judges of these levels or higher.
3A single bronze or higher test judge, appointed in single/pairs or dance for MIF or in single/pairs for FS, may also judge this level.
4A single silver or higher test judge, appointed in single/pairs or dance for MIF or in single/pairs for FS, may also judge this level.
5A single silver or higher dance test judge may also judge this level.

Adult track levels

1The test panel consists of three test judges of these levels or higher, appointed in single/pairs or dance for MIF or in single/pairs for FS.
2The test panel consists of three dance test judges of these levels or higher.
3A single bronze or higher test judge, appointed in single/pairs or dance for MIF or in single/pairs for FS, may also judge this level.
4A single silver or higher dance test judge may also judge this level.
5A single silver or higher test judge, appointed in single/pairs or dance for MIF or in single/pairs for FS, may also judge this level.

Pattern dance
The Compulsory dance was renamed pattern dance.

Each level of pattern dance, with the exception of international, consists of three or four individual dances. Preliminary skaters must pass the Dutch Waltz, Canasta Tango, and Rhythm Blues, while gold-level skaters must pass the Viennese Waltz, Westminster Waltz, Quickstep, and Argentine Tango. There are currently ten dances at the international level.

1The test panel consists of three dance test judges of these levels or higher.
2The test panel consists of one or three dance test judges of these levels or higher.
3A single bronze or higher dance test judge may also judge this level.
4A single silver or higher dance test judge may also judge this level.

Synchronized skating

Synchronized skating teams are not required to pass any tests as a whole. Each individual team member must have passed the appropriate moves-in-the-field test.

1Preliminary moves in the field, dance, or figure is also acceptable.

Qualifying and international competitions

Every year, U.S. Figure Skating sanctions numerous non-qualifying competitions, shows, and carnivals. In addition, it annually sanctions qualifying regional and sectional competitions, in various disciplines, that lead up to championship competitions. The Association also selects those athletes and officials that represent the United States at international competitions.

Regional competitions
The following regional competitions are held in singles skating:

Sectional competitions
The following sectional competitions are held in singles, pairs, ice dance, adult, and synchronized skating:

Championship competitions
The following championship competitions are held in singles, pairs, ice dance, synchronized, adult, and collegiate skating:

* Effective September 1, 2012, the U.S. Junior Championships (for Juvenile and Intermediate level competitors) was eliminated and those levels are held in conjunction with the U.S. Championships.

International competitions
U.S. Figure Skating selects the athletes and officials that represent the United States at international figure skating competitions (Team USA). These competitions include the ISU Junior Grand Prix, Four Continents Figure Skating Championships, the ISU Grand Prix, the World Synchronized Skating Championships, the World Figure Skating Championships, and the Olympic Games.  Although the participants for Worlds and the Olympics are most often the top placers at US Nationals, there have been several times when other skaters have been selected due to injuries preventing them from competing at Nationals; Nancy Kerrigan being selected for the 1994 Olympics over 2nd-place finisher Michelle Kwan is one example.  Most recently 2014 4th-place finisher Ashley Wagner was selected over 3rd place Mirai Nagasu ostensibly because of Wagner's more consistent international record; however because of Wagner's many endorsement contracts her selection has raised concerns about the fairness of the process (since U.S. Championships are not used as a straightforward Olympic trials).

Sponsors
U.S. Figure Skating has a number of sponsors, suppliers, and licensees that provide support to the association either financially or by supplying other goods and services. U.S. Figure Skating also makes available its logo and sanctioned content, primarily competitions, to various licensees.

Media
Skating magazine is the official publication of U.S. Figure Skating. Established in 1923, 11 issues are published annually.

The association also houses the World Figure Skating Museum and Hall of Fame in its headquarters building in Colorado Springs, Colorado.

U.S. Figure Skating maintains two Internet domains, usfsa.org, established in 1997 and usfigureskating.org, established in 2003.

U.S. Figure Skating also has Facebook, Twitter, and Myspace accounts as well and a YouTube channel and Flickr website.

The association has an RSS feed and can push alerts and content via text messaging.

Ice Network
In 2005, U.S. Figure Skating partnered with MLB Advanced Media to set up Ice Network, LLC. Ice Network, LLC is a wholly owned by U.S. Figure Skating. In 2018, Ice Network's website closed.

Memorial Fund

Formation and purpose
On February 15, 1961, the entire United States figure skating team was killed when Sabena Flight 548 crashed en route from New York City to Brussels, Belgium. The team was going to participate in the 1961 World Figure Skating Championships in Prague, Czechoslovakia. Among the team members that perished were 18 athletes, seven coaches and managers, three judges and referees, and six team family members. Within one week of the tragedy, the association announced the formation of a memorial fund in honor of the lost team members.

"The mission of the Memorial Fund is to provide qualified U.S. Figure Skating members in need of financial aid with monetary assistance to pursue their goals both inside and outside the competitive arena. The fund is committed to awarding skating and academic scholarships to those athletes who have demonstrated excellent competitive results and/or academic achievements, and who have potential in national and international competitions."

RISE
In 2009, U.S. Figure Skating commissioned the production of a full-length feature documentary film commemorating the 50th anniversary of the loss of the 1961 U.S. World Figure Skating Championship team and exalting figure skating in the U.S. The movie, RISE, was produced and directed by the Emmy-award-winning company, Lookalike Productions of Englewood, NJ. The film was released on February 17, 2011, for a one-night presentation through NCM Fathom. It was shown again for an encore presentation on March 7, 2011. Proceeds of the movie were used to further the mission of the Memorial Fund.

See also
 Sabena Flight 548

Footnotes

References

Further reading

External links

Web Site
 U.S. Figure Skating
 RISE - Can the end of one dream give rise to another?

Social media
 U.S. Figure Skating's Facebook Page
 U.S. Figure Skating's Twitter Page
 U.S. Figure Skating's YouTube Channel
 U.S. Figure skating's Flickr Photostream
 U.S. Figure Skating's Myspace Page
 U.S. Figure Skating's RSS Feed
 U.S. Figure Skating's Text Alerts

Figure skating in the United States
Figure skating organizations
Figure
Sports in Colorado Springs, Colorado
Organizations based in Colorado Springs, Colorado
Sports organizations established in 1921
National governing bodies for figure skating